Myles Yukata Fukunaga (1909-1929) was a Japanese-American from Honolulu, Hawaii. In 1928, he kidnapped and murdered George Gill Jamieson, the 10-year-old son of a local banker.

Subsequent to the murder, he demanded a $10,000 ransom. Before the body of the victim was found, the Hawaiian Trust Company offered a reward of $5,000 with no questions asked. Fukunaga eventually received $4,000 in $5 bills from the victim's father before he was arrested. He was convicted of murder, sentenced to death, and executed.

Further reading

References 

1909 births
1929 deaths
American kidnappers
American murderers of children
People convicted of murder by Hawaii

People executed by the Territory of Hawaii